The 2011–12 New Jersey Devils season was the 38th season for the National Hockey League franchise that was established on June 11, 1974, and 30th season since the franchise relocated from Colorado prior to the 1982–83 NHL season. The Devils hoped to return to the playoffs after having their long playoff streak snapped the previous year. While finishing fourth in the strong Atlantic Division, they ranked sixth in the Eastern Conference, thus securing a playoff berth, and faced the Southeast Division-winning Florida Panthers in the Conference Quarterfinals where they won in seven games. In the Conference Semifinals, the Devils played against the Philadelphia Flyers and won in five games. In the Conference Finals, they faced their rivals, the New York Rangers, and won in six games advancing to the Stanley Cup Finals for the first time since the 2002–03 season. The Devils lost in the 2012 Stanley Cup Finals to the Los Angeles Kings in six games.

Off-season
The focus of the Devils during the 2011 off-season was on finding a new coach and player signings. The main focus of the team was resigning Zach Parise and signing fourth-overall 2011 pick Adam Larsson to an entry-level contract, although team CEO and General Manager Lou Lamoriello did find the time to sign goaltender Johan Hedberg, as well as defenseman Andy Greene. Additionally, the team chose to suspend operations of the Trenton Devils, which was a minor league ECHL club that the team had used for player development, citing declining fan interest in the team and a desire to bring the organization more in line with other NHL organizations in terms of minor league affiliations.

The Devils announced the hiring of Peter DeBoer as the new head coach of the team on July 19, 2011.

Pre-season
On June 30, 2011, the New Jersey Devils announced that they would play six games during the pre-season. There were three home games at the Prudential Center against the New York Rangers, New York Islanders and Philadelphia Flyers. They also played two road games, one against the Islanders at Nassau Coliseum and one against the Flyers at Wells Fargo Center. One neutral site game against the Rangers took place at the Times Union Center, located in Albany, New York.

Regular season
The Devils had a very effective penalty kill during the regular season, allowing the fewest shorthanded goals in the League (27) and having the highest penalty-kill percentage (89.58%). The 89.58% penalty kill is the best penalty kill by any team in a season in NHL history. They also scored the most shorthanded goals in the NHL (15) and allowed the most shorthanded goals in the League (13).

Playoffs
The Devils clinched their 20th playoff berth in 22 seasons with a 5–0 win over the Carolina Hurricanes on March 31, 2012. They finished the regular season with 102 points, finishing fourth in the Atlantic Division and sixth in the Eastern Conference. The Devils finished the regular season as the 6 seed in the East with 102 points. Returning injured center Travis Zajac led the team's offense as they then proceeded to knock the Florida Panthers out of the playoffs in 7 games, winning game 6 in overtime with a goal from Zajac and another in double overtime in game 7 from Henrique. They moved on to play their division rivals, the Philadelphia Flyers, in the conference semifinals and were considered heavy underdogs in the series. They faced some early setbacks against the Flyers including a Game 1 overtime loss and the injury of all-star Ilya Kovalchuk. However the Devils rallied in Game 2 without their star forward, winning the game by a score of 4-1. Kovalchuk returned strong for Game 3 and his pass to Ponikarovsky gave the Devils a much needed overtime goal to win Game 3. The streak continued as the Devils would win 4 in a row to eventually defeat the Flyers and advance to the Eastern Conference Finals for the first time since 2003. The Devils would play the New York Rangers in the Conference Finals, a rematch of the 1994 series that resulted in a heartbreaking Game 7 overtime loss during Brodeur's rookie season. The series was highly publicized by the New York media and was a tough back-and-forth battle for the first four games, leaving the series split 2-2. The Devils' fourth line, which had been very successful throughout the playoffs, came through in Game 5 to help give the Devils a 3-2 lead in the series. The line consisted of players Ryan Carter, Stephen Gionta and Steve Bernier, all of which had been dropped from a professional roster at some point during the season. Emerging as playoff heroes, they tallied an impressive 19 points in the first three rounds. Despite constant comparisons to the 1994 series, the Devils and Brodeur rewrote history and claimed victory on May 25, 2012, as Henrique scored another series clinching overtime goal in Game 6 to advance the Devils to the Stanley Cup finals against the Los Angeles Kings.  Facing the Kings in the Finals, the Devils lost two consecutive overtime games at home and then game three in Los Angeles. However, the Devils managed to not be swept after losing the first three games in the series, but still lost the Cup in six games.

Standings

Schedule and results

Preseason

|-  style="text-align:center; background:#cfc;"
| 1 || September 21 || NY Rangers || 2–1 (OT) || Times Union Center(Albany, New York) || 1–0–0
|-  style="text-align:center; background:#fcc;"
| 2 || September 23 || NY Rangers || 3–4 || Prudential Center || 1–1–0
|-  style="text-align:center; background:#fcc;"
| 3 || September 24 || NY Islanders || 2–6 || Nassau Veterans Memorial Coliseum || 1–2–0
|-  style="text-align:center; background:#fcc;"
| 4 || September 29 || Philadelphia || 1–2 || Wells Fargo Center || 1–3–0
|-  style="text-align:center; background:#cfc;"
| 5 || September 30 || NY Islanders || 1–0 || Prudential Center || 2–3–0
|-  style="text-align:center; background:#cfc;"
| 6 || October 1 || Philadelphia || 2–1 || Prudential Center || 3–3–0
|-

|

Regular season

|-  style="text-align:center; background:#fcc;"
| 1 || October 8 || 7:00pm || Philadelphia || 0–3 || Prudential Center || 17,625 || 0–1–0 || 0 
|-  style="text-align:center; background:#cfc;"
| 2 || October 10 || 1:00pm || Carolina || 4–2 || Prudential Center || 12,096 || 1–1–0 || 2
|-  style="text-align:center; background:#cfc;"
| 3 || October 13 || 7:00pm || Los Angeles || 2–1 SO || Prudential Center || 12,256 || 2–1–0 || 4
|-  style="text-align:center; background:#cfc;"
| 4 || October 15 || 8:00pm || @ Nashville || 3–2 SO|| Bridgestone Arena || 17,113 || 3–1–0 || 6
|-  style="text-align:center; background:#bbb;"
| 5 || October 21 || 7:00pm || San Jose || 3–4 SO || Prudential Center || 14,319 || 3–1–1 || 7
|-  style="text-align:center; background:#fcc;"
| 6 || October 22 || 7:00pm || @ Pittsburgh || 1–4 || Consol Energy Center || 18,535 || 3–2–1 || 7
|-  style="text-align:center; background:#cfc;"
| 7 || October 25 || 10:30pm || @ Los Angeles || 3–0 || Staples Center || 18,118 || 4–2–1 || 9
|-  style="text-align:center; background:#fcc;"
| 8 || October 27 || 10:00pm || @ Phoenix || 3–5 || Jobing.com Arena || 7,434 || 4–3–1 || 9
|-  style="text-align:center; background:#fcc;"
| 9 || October 29 || 8:00pm || @ Dallas || 1–3 || American Airlines Center || 11,740 || 4–4–1 || 9
|-

|-  style="text-align:center; background:#fcc;"
| 10 || November 2 || 7:30pm || Toronto || 3–5 || Prudential Center || 13,033 || 4–5–1 || 9
|-  style="text-align:center; background:#cfc;"
| 11 || November 3 || 7:00pm || @ Philadelphia || 4–3 SO || Wells Fargo Center || 19,667 || 5–5–1 || 11
|-  style="text-align:center; background:#cfc;"
| 12 || November 5 || 7:00pm || Winnipeg || 3–2 OT || Prudential Center || 14,952 || 6–5–1 || 13
|-  style="text-align:center; background:#cfc;"
| 13 || November 8 || 7:30pm || Carolina || 3–2 || Prudential Center || 13,056 || 7–5–1 || 15
|-  style="text-align:center; background:#fcc;"
| 14 || November 11 || 7:00pm || Washington || 1–3 || Prudential Center || 15,230 || 7–6–1 || 15
|-  style="text-align:center; background:#cfc;"
| 15 || November 12 || 7:00pm || @ Washington || 3–2 SO || Verizon Center || 18,506 || 8–6–1 || 17
|-  style="text-align:center; background:#fcc;"
| 16 || November 15 || 7:00pm || @ Boston || 3–4 || TD Garden || 17,565 || 8–7–1 || 17
|-  style="text-align:center; background:#cfc;"
| 17 || November 16 || 7:30pm || @ Buffalo || 5–3 || First Niagara Center || 18,690 || 9–7–1 || 19
|-  style="text-align:center; background:#cfc;"
| 18 || November 19 || 7:00pm || @ Tampa Bay || 4–2 || St. Pete Times Forum || 18,894 || 10–7–1 || 21
|-  style="text-align:center; background:#fcc;"
| 19 || November 21 || 7:30pm || @ Florida || 3–4 || BankAtlantic Center || 13,122 || 10–8–1 || 21
|-  style="text-align:center; background:#cfc;"
| 20 || November 23 || 7:00pm || Columbus || 2–1 SO || Prudential Center || 15,585 || 11–8–1 || 23
|-  style="text-align:center; background:#cfc;"
| 21 || November 25 || 3:00pm || @ NY Islanders || 1–0 || Nassau Veterans Memorial Coliseum || 15,358 || 12–8–1 || 25
|-  style="text-align:center; background:#fcc;"
| 22 || November 26 || 1:00pm || NY Islanders || 2–3 || Prudential Center || 16,014 || 12–9–1 || 25
|-  style="text-align:center; background:#fcc;"
| 23 || November 30 || 9:30pm || @ Colorado || 1–6 || Pepsi Center || 14,251 || 12–10–1 || 25
|-

|-  style="text-align:center; background:#fcc;"
| 24 || December 2 || 8:00pm || @ Minnesota || 2–4 || XCel Energy Center || 17,310 || 12–11–1 || 25
|-  style="text-align:center; background:#fcc;"
| 25 || December 3 || 7:00pm || @ Winnipeg || 2–4 || MTS Centre || 15,004 || 12–12–1 || 25
|-  style="text-align:center; background:#cfc;"
| 26 || December 6 || 7:00pm || @ Toronto || 3–2 OT || Air Canada Centre || 19,513 || 13–12–1 || 27
|-  style="text-align:center; background:#cfc;"
| 27 || December 8 || 7:00pm || Ottawa || 5–4 SO || Prudential Center || 13,743 || 14–12–1 || 29
|-  style="text-align:center; background:#fcc;"
| 28 || December 10 || 1:00pm || Montreal || 1–2 || Prudential Center || 14,210 || 14–13–1 || 29
|-  style="text-align:center; background:#cfc;"
| 29 || December 12 || 7:00pm || @ Tampa Bay || 5–4 || St. Pete Times Forum || 17,341 || 15–13–1 || 31
|-  style="text-align:center; background:#cfc;"
| 30 || December 13 || 7:30pm || @ Florida || 3–2 SO || BankAtlantic Center || 14,669 || 16–13–1 || 33
|-  style="text-align:center; background:#cfc;"
| 31 || December 16 || 7:00pm || Dallas || 6–3 || Prudential Center || 17,625 || 17–13–1 || 35
|-  style="text-align:center; background:#cfc;"
| 32 || December 17 || 7:00pm || @ Montreal || 5–3 || Bell Centre || 21,273 || 18–13–1 || 37
|-  style="text-align:center; background:#fcc;"
| 33 || December 20 || 7:00pm || NY Rangers || 1–4 || Prudential Center || 17,625 || 18–14–1 || 37
|-  style="text-align:center; background:#cfc;"
| 34 || December 23 || 7:00pm || Washington || 4–3 SO || Prudential Center || 14,043 || 19–14–1 || 39
|-  style="text-align:center; background:#fcc;"
| 35 || December 26 || 7:00pm || @ Carolina || 2–4 || RBC Center || 16,121 || 19–15–1 || 39
|-  style="text-align:center; background:#cfc;"
| 36 || December 28 || 7:00pm || Buffalo || 3–1 || Prudential Center || 17,625 || 20–15–1 || 41
|-  style="text-align:center; background:#cfc;"
| 37 || December 31 || 3:00pm || Pittsburgh || 3–1 || Prudential Center || 17,625 || 21–15–1 || 43
|-

|-  style="text-align:center; background:#bbb;"
| 38 || January 2 || 7:30pm || @ Ottawa || 2–3 OT || Scotiabank Place || 19,573 || 21–15–2 || 44
|-  style="text-align:center; background:#fcc;"
| 39 || January 4 || 7:30pm || Boston || 1–6 || Prudential Center || 15,832 || 21–16–2 || 44
|-  style="text-align:center; background:#cfc;"
| 40 || January 6 || 7:00pm || Florida || 5–2 || Prudential Center || 15,793 || 22–16–2 || 46
|-  style="text-align:center; background:#cfc;"
| 41 || January 7 || 7:00pm || @ Pittsburgh || 3–1 || Consol Energy Center || 18,594 || 23–16–2 || 48
|-  style="text-align:center; background:#fcc;"
| 42 || January 10 || 9:30pm || @ Calgary || 3–6 || Scotiabank Saddledome || 19,289 || 23–17–2 || 48
|-  style="text-align:center; background:#cfc;"
| 43 || January 11 || 9:00pm || @ Edmonton || 2–1 OT || Rexall Place || 16,839 || 24–17–2 || 50
|-  style="text-align:center; background:#cfc;"
| 44 || January 14 || 3:00pm || @ Winnipeg || 2–1 || MTS Centre || 15,004 || 25–17–2 || 52
|-  style="text-align:center; background:#cfc;"
| 45 || January 17 || 7:00pm || Winnipeg || 5–1 || Prudential Center || 14,129 || 26–17–2 || 54
|-  style="text-align:center; background:#fcc;"
| 46 || January 19 || 7:00pm || Boston || 1–4 || Prudential Center || 14,941 || 26–18–2 || 54
|-  style="text-align:center; background:#fcc;"
| 47 || January 21 || 1:00pm || Philadelphia || 1–4 || Prudential Center || 16,251 || 26–19–2 ||54
|-  style="text-align:center; background:#bbb;"
| 48 || January 24 || 7:00pm || Buffalo || 1–2 SO || Prudential Center || 13,735 || 26–19–3 ||55
|-  style="text-align:center; background:#cfc;"
| 49 || January 31 || 7:00pm || NY Rangers || 4–3 SO || Prudential Center || 17,625 || 27–19–3 || 57
|-

|-  style="text-align:center; background:#cfc;"
| 50 || February 2 || 7:00pm || Montreal || 5–3 || Prudential Center || 13,283 || 28–19–3 || 59
|-  style="text-align:center; background:#cfc;"
| 51 || February 4 || 1:00pm || @ Philadelphia || 6–4 || Wells Fargo Center || 19,862 || 29–19–3 || 61
|-  style="text-align:center; background:#cfc;"
| 52 || February 5 || 1:00pm || Pittsburgh || 5–3 || Prudential Center || 14,707 || 30–19–3 || 63
|-  style="text-align:center; background:#cfc;"
| 53 || February 7 || 7:00pm || @ NY Rangers || 1–0 || Madison Square Garden || 18,200 || 31–19–3 || 65
|-  style="text-align:center; background:#bbb;"
| 54 || February 9 || 7:00pm || St. Louis || 3–4 SO || Prudential Center || 15,021 || 31–19–4 || 66
|-  style="text-align:center; background:#fcc;"
| 55 || February 11 || 1:00pm || Florida || 1–3 || Prudential Center || 14,938 || 31–20–4 || 66
|-  style="text-align:center; background:#cfc;"
| 56 || February 14 || 7:00pm || @ Buffalo || 4–1 || First Niagara Center || 18,690 || 32–20–4 || 68
|-  style="text-align:center; background:#cfc;"
| 57 || February 17 || 7:00pm || Anaheim || 3–2 SO || Prudential Center || 15,312 || 33–20–4 || 70
|-  style="text-align:center; background:#cfc;"
| 58 || February 19 || 6:00pm || @ Montreal || 3–1 || Bell Centre || 21,273 || 34–20–4 || 72
|-  style="text-align:center; background:#cfc;"
| 59 || February 21 || 7:00pm || @ Toronto || 4–3 OT || Air Canada Centre || 19,426 || 35–20–4 || 74
|-  style="text-align:center; background:#fcc;"
| 60 || February 24 || 7:00pm || Vancouver || 1–2 || Prudential Center || 16,480 || 35–21–4 || 74
|-  style="text-align:center; background:#fcc;"
| 61 || February 26 || 1:00pm || Tampa Bay || 3–4 || Prudential Center || 15,981 || 35–22–4 || 74
|-  style="text-align:center; background:#fcc;"
| 62 || February 27 || 7:30pm || @ NY Rangers || 0–2 || Madison Square Garden || 18,200 || 35–23–4 || 74
|-

|-  style="text-align:center; background:#bbb;"
| 63 || March 1 || 7:00pm || @ Boston || 3–4 OT || TD Garden || 17,565 || 35–23–5 || 75
|-  style="text-align:center; background:#cfc;"
| 64 || March 2 || 7:00pm || @ Washington || 5–0 || Verizon Center || 18,506 || 36–23–5 || 77
|-  style="text-align:center; background:#fcc;"
| 65 || March 4 || 3:00pm || @ NY Islanders || 0–1 || Nassau Veterans Memorial Coliseum || 16,250 || 36–24–5 || 77
|-  style="text-align:center; background:#cfc;"
| 66 || March 6 || 7:00pm || NY Rangers || 4–1 || Prudential Center || 17,625 || 37–24–5 || 79
|-  style="text-align:center; background:#cfc;"
| 67 || March 8 || 7:00pm || NY Islanders || 5–1 || Prudential Center || 14,573 || 38–24–5 || 81
|-  style="text-align:center; background:#cfc;"
| 68 || March 10 || 7:00pm || @ NY Islanders || 2–1 || Nassau Veterans Memorial Coliseum || 16,250 || 39–24–5 || 83
|-  style="text-align:center; background:#cfc;"
| 69 || March 11 || 7:00pm || Philadelphia || 4–1 || Prudential Center || 15,107 || 40–24–5 || 85
|-  style="text-align:center; background:#fcc;"
| 70 || March 13 || 7:00pm || @ Philadelphia || 0–3 || Wells Fargo Center || 19,724 || 40–25–5 || 85
|-  style="text-align:center; background:#cfc;"
| 71 || March 15 || 7:00pm || Colorado || 1–0 SO || Prudential Center || 16,055 || 41–25–5 || 87
|-  style="text-align:center; background:#fcc;"
| 72 || March 17 || 1:00pm || Pittsburgh || 2–5 || Prudential Center || 17,625 || 41–26–5 || 87
|-  style="text-align:center; background:#fcc;"
| 73 || March 19 || 7:30pm || @ NY Rangers || 2–4 || Madison Square Garden || 18,200 || 41–27–5 || 87
|-  style="text-align:center; background:#cfc;"
| 74 || March 20 || 7:30pm || @ Ottawa || 1–0 || Scotiabank Place || 19,834 || 42–27–5 || 89
|-  style="text-align:center; background:#bbb;"
| 75 || March 23 || 7:00pm || Toronto || 3–4 SO || Prudential Center || 16,022 || 42–27–6 || 90
|-  style="text-align:center; background:#fcc;"
| 76 || March 25 || 7:00pm || @ Pittsburgh || 2–5 || Consol Energy Center || 18,601 || 42–28–6 || 90
|-  style="text-align:center; background:#cfc;"
| 77 || March 27 || 7:00pm || Chicago || 2–1 SO || Prudential Center || 15,074 || 43–28–6 || 92
|-  style="text-align:center; background:#cfc;"
| 78 || March 29 || 7:00pm || Tampa Bay || 6–4 || Prudential Center || 15,380 || 44–28–6 || 94
|-  style="text-align:center; background:#cfc;"
| 79 || March 31 || 7:00pm || @ Carolina || 5–0 || RBC Center || 18,680 || 45–28–6 || 96
|-

|-  style="text-align:center; background:#cfc;"
| 80 || April 3 || 7:00pm || NY Islanders || 3–1 || Prudential Center || 15,482 || 46–28–6 || 98
|-  style="text-align:center; background:#cfc;"
| 81 || April 5 || 7:30pm || @ Detroit || 2–1 || Joe Louis Arena || 20,066 || 47–28–6 || 100
|-  style="text-align:center; background:#cfc;"
| 82 || April 7 || 3:00pm || Ottawa || 4-2 || Prudential Center || 17,625 || 48–28–6 || 102
|-

Playoffs

|-  style="text-align:center; background:#cfc;"
| 1 || April 13 || New Jersey Devils || 3–2 || Florida Panthers || || Brodeur || 19,119 || Devils lead 1-0 || New Jersey Devils - Florida Panthers - April 13th, 2012
|-  style="text-align:center; background:#fcc;"
| 2 || April 15 || New Jersey Devils || 2–4 || Florida Panthers || || Brodeur || 19,248 || Series tied 1-1 || New Jersey Devils - Florida Panthers - April 15th, 2012
|-  style="text-align:center; background:#fcc;"
| 3 || April 17 || Florida Panthers || 4–3 || New Jersey Devils || || Hedberg || 17,625 || Panthers lead 2-1 || Florida Panthers - New Jersey Devils - April 17th, 2012
|-  style="text-align:center; background:#cfc;"
| 4 || April 19 || Florida Panthers || 0–4 || New Jersey Devils || || Brodeur || 17,625 || Series tied 2-2 || Florida Panthers - New Jersey Devils - April 19th, 2012
|-  style="text-align:center; background:#fcc;"
| 5 || April 21 || New Jersey Devils || 0–3 || Florida Panthers || || Brodeur || 19,513 || Panthers lead 3-2 || New Jersey Devils - Florida Panthers - April 21st, 2012
|-  style="text-align:center; background:#cfc;"
| 6 || April 24 || Florida Panthers || 2–3 || New Jersey Devils || OT || Brodeur || 17,625 || Series tied 3-3 || Florida Panthers - New Jersey Devils - April 24th, 2012
|-  style="text-align:center; background:#bff;" 
| 7 || April 26 || New Jersey Devils || 3–2 || Florida Panthers || 2OT || Brodeur || 19,313 || Devils win 4-3 || New Jersey Devils - Florida Panthers - April 26th, 2012
|-

|-  style="text-align:center; background:#fcc;"
| 1 || April 29 || New Jersey Devils || 3–4 || Philadelphia Flyers || OT || Brodeur || 19,972 || Flyers lead 1-0 || Devils vs. Flyers - 04/29/2012 - New Jersey Devils - Recap
|-  style="text-align:center; background:#cfc;"
| 2 || May 1 || New Jersey Devils || 4–1 || Philadelphia Flyers || || Brodeur || 20,131 || Series tied 1-1 || Devils vs. Flyers - 05/01/2012 - New Jersey Devils - Recap
|-  style="text-align:center; background:#cfc;" 
| 3 || May 3 || Philadelphia Flyers || 3–4 || New Jersey Devils || OT || Brodeur || 17,625 || Devils lead 2-1 || Flyers vs. Devils - 05/03/2012 - New Jersey Devils - Recap
|-  style="text-align:center; background:#cfc;"
| 4 || May 6 || Philadelphia Flyers || 2–4 || New Jersey Devils || || Brodeur || 17,625 || Devils lead 3-1 ||Flyers vs. Devils - 05/06/2012 - New Jersey Devils - Recap
|-  style="text-align:center; background:#bbffff;"
| 5 || May 8 || New Jersey Devils || 3–1 || Philadelphia Flyers || || Brodeur || 20,145 || Devils win 4-1 ||Flyers vs. Devils - 05/06/2012 - New Jersey Devils - Recap
|-

|-  style="text-align:center; background:#fcc;"
| 1 || May 14 || New Jersey Devils || 0–3 || New York Rangers || || Brodeur || 18,200 || Rangers lead 1-0  || 
|-  style="text-align:center; background:#cfc;"
| 2 || May 16 || New Jersey Devils || 3–2 || New York Rangers || || Brodeur || 18,200 || Series tied 1-1 || Devils vs. Rangers - 05/16/2012 - New Jersey Devils - Recap
|-  style="text-align:center; background:#fcc;"
| 3 || May 19 || New York Rangers || 3–0 || New Jersey Devils  || || Brodeur || 17,625 || Rangers lead 2-1  || 
|-  style="text-align:center; background:#cfc;"
| 4 || May 21 || New York Rangers || 1–4 || New Jersey Devils  || || Brodeur || 17,625 || Series tied 2-2 || Rangers vs. Devils - 05/21/2012 - New Jersey Devils - Recap
|-  style="text-align:center; background:#cfc;"
| 5 || May 23 || New Jersey Devils  || 5–3 || New York Rangers || || Brodeur || 18,200 || Devils lead 3-2 || Devils vs. Rangers - 05/23/2012 - New Jersey Devils - Recap
|-  style="text-align:center; background:#bff;"
| 6 || May 25 || New York Rangers || 2–3 || New Jersey Devils  || OT || Brodeur || 17,625 || Devils win series 4-2 || Rangers vs. Devils - 05/25/2012 - New Jersey Devils - Recap
|-

|-  style="text-align:center; background:#fcc;"
| 1 || May 30 || Los Angeles Kings || 2–1 || New Jersey Devils || OT || Brodeur || 17,625 || Kings lead 1-0 || Kings vs. Devils - 05/30/2012 - New Jersey Devils - Recap
|-  style="text-align:center; background:#fcc;"
| 2 || June 2 || Los Angeles Kings || 2–1 || New Jersey Devils || OT || Brodeur || 17,625 || Kings lead 2-0 || Kings vs. Devils - 06/02/2012 - New Jersey Devils - Recap
|-  style="text-align:center; background:#fcc;"
| 3 || June 4 || New Jersey Devils || 0–4 || Los Angeles Kings ||  || Brodeur || 18,764 || Kings lead 3-0 || Devils vs. Kings - 06/04/2012 - New Jersey Devils - Recap
|-  style="text-align:center; background:#cfc;"
| 4 || June 6 || New Jersey Devils || 3–1 || Los Angeles Kings ||  || Brodeur || 18,867 || Kings lead 3-1 || Devils vs. Kings - 06/06/2012 - New Jersey Devils - Recap
|-  style="text-align:center; background:#cfc;"
| 5 || June 9 || Los Angeles Kings || 1–2 || New Jersey Devils ||  || Brodeur || 17,625 || Kings lead 3-2 || Kings vs. Devils - 06/09/2012 - New Jersey Devils - Recap
|-  style="text-align:center; background:#fcc;"
| 6 || June 11 || New Jersey Devils || 1–6 || Los Angeles Kings ||  || Brodeur || 18,858 || Kings win 4-2 || Devils vs. Kings - 06/11/2012 - New Jersey Devils - Recap
|-

| Win  Loss  Win Playoff Series

Media
This season would be Steve Cangialosi's first season as a regular television play-by-play announcer for the Devils. Deb Placey and Ken Daneyko did color and studio analysis commentating. Radio coverage was still on WFAN (AM) 660 with Matt Loughlin and Sherry Ross as usual.

Player statistics

Skaters
Note: GP = Games played; G = Goals; A = Assists; Pts = Points; +/− = Plus/Minus; PIM = Penalty Minutes

Goaltenders

†Denotes player spent time with another team before joining Devils. Stats reflect time with Devils only.
‡Traded mid-season. Stats reflect time with Devils only.

Awards and records

Awards

Nominations

Records

Milestones

Transactions
The Devils have been involved in the following transactions during the 2011–12 season.

Trades

|}

Free agents signed

Free agents lost

Claimed via waivers

Lost via waivers

Player signings

Draft picks
The New Jersey Devils participated in the 2011 NHL Entry Draft, located at the Xcel Energy Center in Saint Paul, Minnesota, on June 24, 2011. Devils CEO, president and general manager Lou Lamoriello, described as being "thrilled" at the chance to draft him, selected Swedish defenseman Adam Larsson fourth overall. This was the Devils' highest pick in the draft since selecting Scott Neidermayer third overall in the 1991 NHL Entry Draft.

Notes

See also
 2011–12 NHL season

References

New Jersey Devils seasons
New Jersey Devils
New Jersey Devils
New Jersey Devils
New Jersey Devils
New Jersey Devils
21st century in Newark, New Jersey
Eastern Conference (NHL) championship seasons